"Terrible Things My Mother Told Me" is a 1988 episode of the American television anthology series ABC Afterschool Special, directed and produced by Susan Rohrer. It stars Beth Howland, Katherine Kamhi and Ian Ziering.

Plot
Hard-working 16-year-old Julia does not realize that her mother Eleanor - who alternately harasses and ignores Julia, while doting on lazy younger daughter Katie - is being emotionally and verbally abusive. But when Julia is given the lead in a school play directed by popular Randy, she realizes she is every bit as worthy of Eleanor's support and encouragement as her pampered sister.

Cast
 Beth Howland as Eleanor Flemming
 Katherine Kamhi as Julia Flemming
 Ian Ziering as Randy Forrester
 Ita DeMarco as Katie Flemming
 Stephen James as Mr. Bacharan
 Carol Goodheart as Mary Forrester
 Stephanie Winters as Beth Sotheby

Release
The film was premiered on January 20, 1988, on ABC as the fifth episode of the 16th season of ABC Afterschool Special.

References

External links
 

1988 American television episodes
ABC Afterschool Special episodes
Television episodes about child abuse